Diyan Donchev Angelov is a retired Bulgarian association football player who played professionally in Bulgaria, Spain and the United States.

In 1981, Angelov became a professional with FC Dunav Ruse.  Over the years, he played for several teams in Bulgaria.  In October 1991, CA Osasuna paid 20 million pesetas for Angelov.  His time with Osasuna was a disappointment and in November 1993, he received a free transfer to PFC Levski Sofia.  In 1997, he moved to the United States and signed with the Richmond Kickers in the USISL A-League.  He was an All Star that season.  In 1998, he finished his career with the Hampton Roads Mariners.

Honours
Levski Sofia
 Bulgarian League: 1993–94
 Bulgarian Cup: 1993–94

Lokomotiv Sofia
 Bulgarian Cup: 1994–95

Slavia Sofia
 Bulgarian League: 1995–96
 Bulgarian Cup: 1995–96

References

External links
 
 Profile at Levskisofia.info

Living people
1964 births
Bulgarian footballers
Bulgarian expatriate footballers
FC Dunav Ruse players
PFC Slavia Sofia players
CA Osasuna players
PFC Levski Sofia players
FC Lokomotiv 1929 Sofia players
Virginia Beach Mariners players
Richmond Kickers players
First Professional Football League (Bulgaria) players
La Liga players
A-League (1995–2004) players
Expatriate footballers in Spain
Association football midfielders
People from Razgrad